"Baby Doll" is a song written by Mårten Eriksson, Lina Eriksson and Susie Päivärinta. The song was performed in the second semifinal of Melodifestivalen 2012 by the Top Cats. From Andra chansen the song made it to the finals inside the Stockholm Globe Arewna, where it ended up 6th.

On 22 April 2012, the song entered Svensktoppen.

Charts

References

2012 songs
2012 singles
Melodifestivalen songs of 2012
Rockabilly songs
Songs written by Lina Eriksson
Songs written by Susie Päivärinta
Songs written by Mårten Eriksson